The Barzan class is a class of 4 British-designed fast attack missile boats for the Qatari Emiri Navy, also known as Super Vita.

History 
The Barzan class was ordered by the Qatari Emiri Navy in 1992. Vosper Thornycroft was chosen to build the 4 ships of the class. The 4 ship’s names are QENS Barzan, QENS Huwar, QENS Al Udied and QENS Al Deebeel.

Barzan and Huwar were the first batch to arrive in Qatar in 1996 while Al Udied and Al Deebel arrived as the second batch in 1998.

Design 
The craft are developments of the VT 56m patrol boats delivered to the Kenyan and Omani navies. The hull is made of steel and the superstructure is made of aluminium, while Vosper Thornycroft, now BAE Systems Surface Ships, provided the electricity transmission system, the management board, electrical equipment and countermeasure systems.

Ships

References 

Missile boat classes
Ships of the Qatari Emiri Navy